"Who I Am Hates Who I've Been" is a song by American Christian rock band Relient K. It was released in June 2005 as the second single from their 2004 album Mmhmm. An acoustic version, originally recorded for Apathetic EP, is included on the B-side, was included on the 2008 The Bird and the Bee Sides album. The music video entered TRLs top 10 in 2005, reaching as high as eight on the countdown. "Who I Am Hates Who I've Been" was released to radio on August 23, 2005. The song reached No. 58 on the US Billboard Hot 100, making it their most successful single to date. The song has been certified gold in the US for sales surpassing 500,000 units.

Background and writing
Matt Thiessen wrote the song in Australia in light of a feud with Brian Pittman, the band's bassist. The lyrics reflect remorse for his behavior, as well as pleas for forgiveness.

Music video

The music video for the song shows a woman encountering various events being rewound and replayed, interposed with scenes of Relient K performing on an urban rooftop. The video starts off with a view of a room and a young woman. The camera then pans out to see her step outside. The first series of event that happens is as follows; a grocer tosses her a random green fruit and she catches it, then she stops walking and realizes that everything else around her stopped too. She starts walking back and forth while watching an old woman drop and rewind her library books.

As the woman moves, her actions control everyone around her; an old man moving side to side with a TV, another young man on his cell phone and an Asian man crossing the street while preoccupied with reading a magazine. The young woman makes a mistake and takes too many steps and watches as she causes the Asian man to be hit by a Plymouth Reliant car. Shocked, she tries retracing her steps and starts back at where the grocer tosses her the fruit and takes a few steps to the side and starts walking again. Since it is not the same path as the first time, the events have changed. Instead of her catching the fruit, the man on the cell phone is instead, hit by it and he drops his phone. As he bends down to pick it up he accidentally kicks it into the path of a bicycle that has to swerve to miss him but instead nearly hits the old man with the TV and causes him to drop it.

This all results in the Asian man avoiding the hit and the video ends with her walking away. There is a short piano-only chorus in the middle of the song that was cut from the video. As with the "Be My Escape" video, exclusions visually include Dave Douglas singing background vocals, and Matt Thiessen playing the piano. The video was released in October 2005.

Single track listing
"Who I Am Hates Who I've Been" (radio edit)
"Who I Am Hates Who I've Been" (acoustic)

Video credits 

 Matt Thiessen – lead vocals, guitar, piano
 Matt Hoopes – guitar, backing vocals
 Dave Douglas – drums, backing vocals
 John Warne – bass, backing vocals
 Jon Schneck – guitar
 C.C. Sheffield – girl on the street who controls time
 Jon Watts – director

Awards
In 2006, the song was nominated for a Dove Award for Rock Recorded Song of the Year at the 37th GMA Dove Awards.

Chart positions

Certifications
On February 15, 2006, the song was certified Gold in the United States.

References

2004 songs
2005 singles
Relient K songs
Songs written by Matt Thiessen